Phylloblastia bielczykiae is a species of foliicolous (leaf-dwelling) lichen in the family Verrucariaceae. Found in Bolivia, it was formally described as a new species in 2008 by lichenologists Adam Flakus and Robert Lücking. The type specimen was collected near lake Copaiba (José Ballivián Province, Beni Department); there, in an isolated island of lowland Amazon rainforest along a savanna, it was found growing on the leaves of a vascular plant. It is only known from the type locality. The species epithet honours the Polish lichenologist Urszula Bielczyk.

The lichen has an indistinct, crustose thallus with a mealy (farinose) to grainy (granulose) texture, and a pale yellowish-green to olivaceous colour. It is somewhat similar to Phylloblastia inconspicua, but has smaller ascospores (typically measuring 3–9 by 40–55 μm).

References

Verrucariales
Lichen species
Lichens described in 2008
Lichens of Bolivia
Taxa named by Adam Grzegorz Flakus
Taxa named by Robert Lücking